Alhaji Ahmed Ramadan is Ghanaian politician and former chairman of People's National Convention (PNC). He retired from active politics in 2015.

Politics 
He is a former chairman of the People's National Convention(PNC). In 2017 he was appointed by President Akufo-Addo as Ghana's first Ambassador to the United Arab Emirates.

Personal life
Alhaji Ramadan is father of three Ghanaian notable personalities; Abu Ramadan (Youth Organizer of PNC), Mohammed Adamu Ramadan (NDC parliamentary aspirant for Adentan) and Samira Bawumia.

References

Living people
Ghanaian Muslims
Ghanaian Zongo people
Year of birth missing (living people)